The 2022–23 REMA 1000-ligaen is the 56th season of REMA 1000-ligaen, Norway's premier handball league.

Team information 
A total of 12 teams will be participating in the 2022/23 edition of REMA 1000-ligaen. 11 teams were qualified directly from the 2021/22 season. Only Volda Handball from 1. divisjon, was promoted to REMA 1000-ligaen.

Regular season
Usually, the team placing 12th will be relegated to the 1. divisjon, and the teams placing 9th, 10th and 11th will have to play a relegation playoff tournament. However, since next season will consist of 14 teams, only the team placed 12th will have to play relegation playoff matches this season, against the team placed 3rd in First Division.

Standings

Results
In the table below the home teams are listed on the left and the away teams along the top.

Season statistics

Top goalscorers

References

External links
 Norwegian Handball Federaration 

Eliteserien
Eliteserien
Eliteserien
Norway